Nicholas Dopuch (15 November 1929 – 4 February 2018) was an American accounting researcher and educator. He was a professor at Olin Business School at Washington University in St. Louis.

In 2006, Dopuch was named to the Accounting Hall of Fame.
His 1993 article, "A Perspective on Cost Drivers" (The Accounting Review, Vol. 88, No. 3), is an example of why Dopuch was named to the Accounting Hall of Fame.  All serious management accounting researchers should read and embrace this concise classic.

References

External links
Biography at OSU's Accounting Hall of Fame

1929 births
2018 deaths
Accounting academics
Place of birth missing
Washington University in St. Louis faculty
Gies College of Business alumni
University of Illinois Urbana-Champaign alumni